In dentistry, cingulum (Latin: girdle or belt) refers to an anatomical feature of the teeth. It refers to the portion of the teeth that forms a convex protuberance at the cervical third of the anatomic crown. It represents the lingual or palatal developmental lobe of these teeth. 

In zoology and palaeontology, cingulum refers to this feature only in the upper teeth. When this occurs in the lower teeth it is called the cingulid.

References

Teeth